Charles Anthoine Gonnet (November 3, 1897 – September 26, 1985) was a French poet. He was born in Laon. In 1924 he won a bronze medal in the art competitions of the Olympic Games for his "Vers le Dieu d'Olympie" ("Face to Face with Olympia's God").

References

External links
Charles Gonnet's profile at Database Olympics
Charles Gonnet's profile at Scrum.com

1897 births
1985 deaths
Olympic bronze medalists in art competitions
French male poets
20th-century French poets
Medalists at the 1924 Summer Olympics
20th-century French male writers
Olympic competitors in art competitions